Events from the year 1871 in Canada.

Incumbents

Crown 
 Monarch – Victoria

Federal government 
 Governor General – John Young, 1st Baron Lisgar 
 Prime Minister – John A. Macdonald
 Parliament – 1st

Provincial governments

Lieutenant governors 
Lieutenant Governor of British Columbia – Joseph Trutch (from July 5)
Lieutenant Governor of Manitoba – Adams George Archibald  
Lieutenant Governor of New Brunswick – Lemuel Allan Wilmot 
Lieutenant Governor of Nova Scotia – Charles Hastings Doyle    
Lieutenant Governor of Ontario – William Pearce Howland    
Lieutenant Governor of Quebec – Narcisse-Fortunat Belleau

Premiers    
Premier of British Columbia – John Foster McCreight (from November 14)
Premier of Manitoba – Alfred Boyd (until December 14) then Marc-Amable Girard  
Premier of New Brunswick – George Edwin King (until February 21) then George Luther Hathaway    
Premier of Nova Scotia – William Annand 
Premier of Ontario – John Sandfield Macdonald (until December 20) then Edward Blake     
Premier of Quebec – Pierre-Joseph-Olivier Chauveau

Territorial governments

Lieutenant governors 
 Lieutenant Governor of the Northwest Territories – Adams George Archibald

Elections 

March 21 – The 1871 Ontario election: Edward Blake's Liberals win a majority, defeating J. S. Macdonald's Liberal-Conservatives
May 16 – The 1871 Nova Scotia election: William Annand's Liberals win a second consecutive majority
Oct 16 – Dec 15 – The 1871 British Columbia election

Events

January to June
March 15 – Beginning of the first session of the 1st Manitoba Legislature
April 2 – The first Canadian census finds the population to be 3,689,257
May 8 – The Treaty of Washington reaches agreements on fishing rights and Great Lakes trade between Canada and the United States
May 17 – New Brunswick abandons separate schools.

July to December
July 15 – Phoebe Campbell murders her husband with an axe.  She is hanged the next year.
July 20 – British Columbia joins Confederation.
July 25 – Treaty 1, the first of a number of treaties with western Canada's First Nations, is signed
August 17 – Treaty 2 is signed
November 11 – The last of the British Army leaves Canada
November 13 – John McCreight becomes the first premier of British Columbia
December 14 – Marc-Amable Girard becomes the first Franco-Manitoban of premier of Manitoba, replacing Alfred Boyd
December 20 – Edward Blake becomes premier of Ontario, replacing J. S. Macdonald.

Full date unknown
Meteorological Service of Canada is formed
Parliament legalizes the use of the metric system
Goldwin Smith immigrates to Canada
Ontario Schools Act is passed in Ontario, requiring all students aged 7 to 12 to attend school.
The 1871 Quebec election : Pierre-Joseph-Olivier Chauveau's Conservatives win a second consecutive majority

Births

January 30 – Wilfred Lucas, actor, film director and screenwriter (d.1940)
May 14 – Walter Stanley Monroe, businessman, politician and Prime Minister of Newfoundland (d.1952)
July 16 – George Stewart Henry, politician and 10th Premier of Ontario (d.1958)
July 25 – Richard Ernest William Turner, soldier and recipient of the Victoria Cross (d.1961)
August 4 – Robert Hamilton Butts, politician (d.1943)
September 8 – Samuel McLaughlin, businessman and philanthropist (d.1972)
September 9 – Hugh Robson, politician and judge
October 31 – Alexander Stirling MacMillan, businessman, politician and Premier of Nova Scotia (d.1955)
December 2 – Stanislas Blanchard, politician (d.1949)
December 13 – Emily Carr, artist and writer (d.1945)

Deaths

January 29 – Philippe-Joseph Aubert de Gaspé, lawyer, writer, fifth and last seigneur of Saint-Jean-Port-Joli (L'Islet County) (b.1786)
January 31 – John Ross, lawyer, politician, and businessman. (b. 1818)
February 20 – Paul Kane, artist (b.1810)
March 11 – John Heckman, political figure (b.1785) 
July 28 – Modeste Demers, missionary (b.1809)
September 23 – Louis-Joseph Papineau, lawyer, politician and reformist (b.1786)
November 18 – Enos Collins, seaman, merchant, financier, and legislator (b.1774)

Historical documents
Editorial says Confederation is British Columbia's chance to remake itself

Canada should refuse to permanently share its inshore fishery with U.S.A.

Manitoba Lieutenant Governor Archibald agrees to release four Indigenous prisoners before negotiating Treaty 1

Archibald urges Indigenous people to "adopt the habits of the whites" (farming) for more comfort and safety from famine and sickness

Commissioner Simpson says in Manitoba's "immense cultivable acres," large reserves are not allowed, and treaty terms are "a present"

Treaty terms with large reserves are demanded by Indigenous leaders, with one calling himself "the lawful owner" of his people's land

Indigenous leaders continue to make "extravagant demands" and Commissioner Simpson says take it or leave it, settlers are coming

Fenian raid on Manitoba stopped at the border

Manitoba Lieutenant Governor thanks residents for rising to resist the Fenian invasion

References
  

 
Years of the 19th century in Canada
Canada
1871 in North America